was a town located in Miyako District, Okinawa Prefecture, Japan.

As of 2003, the town had an estimated population of 6,577 and a density of 167.78 persons per km². The total area was 39.20 km².

On October 1, 2005, Irabu, along with the city of Hirara, and the towns of Gusukube and Shimoji, and the village of Ueno (all from Miyako District), was merged to create the city of Miyakojima.

Climate

References

Dissolved municipalities of Okinawa Prefecture

de:Irabu-jima
zh:伊良部島